The Vienna International Film Festival, or Viennale, is a film festival taking place every October since 1960 in Vienna, Austria.
The average number of visitors is about 75,000. Traditional cinema venues are Gartenbaukino, Urania, Metro-Kino, Filmmuseum and Stadtkino. At the end of the festival, the Vienna Film Prize is awarded.

History

The festival features a collection of new films from all over the world, as well as national and international premieres. Apart from new feature films in various film genres, the festival focuses on documentary films, short films, experimental films and crossover productions. Together with the Austrian Film Museum, a historical retrospective is organized every year, as well as special programs, tributes and homages to international institutions and individuals.

During the festival, the Fipresci Prize is awarded by international film critics. Another prize is awarded by the readers of the Austrian newspaper Der Standard.

The program of the festival includes galas, special events and celebrations, as well as discussions and meetings between international guests and local visitors.

The Vienna International Film Festival is different from the Film Festival Rathausplatz in central Vienna, which exclusively shows music films daily throughout August.

External links
 Vienna International Film Festival
 Film Festival Rathausplatz

Film festivals in Austria
Festivals in Vienna
Documentary film festivals in Austria
Short film festivals
Experimental film festivals
Tourist attractions in Vienna
Film festivals established in 1960
Autumn events in Austria